Al-Issawiya (is a Palestinian neighborhood in East Jerusalem. It is located on  the eastern slopes of the Mount Scopus ridge. To the east and north, it is bordered by Route 1, which connects Jerusalem with the settlement of Ma’ale Adumim; immediately adjoining it to the north, west and southwest are the Hadassah Medical Center, the Hebrew University campus, the Jewish neighborhoods of French Hill and the Ofarit military base; to the south, there is a planned park (the Mount Scopus slopes national park).

In 1945, the village lands encompassed 10,417 dunams.

Etymology
Edward Henry Palmer  in 1881 thought that the  name meant "the place or sect of Jesus (ʿIsa)."

History
A burial cave, with pottery dating to the Early Roman period (first century CE), has been found at Isawiya.

Two burial chambers were documented in 2003, one dating to the Roman period, the other to the Byzantine era (sixth–eighth centuries CE). A burial cave with a 4 line inscription in Greek have been examined, the inscription ascribes the tomb to the daughters of the Kyros family.

Ottoman era
Isawiya, like the rest of Palestine, was incorporated into the Ottoman Empire in 1517, and in the 1560s the revenues of al-Isawiya were designated for the waqf of Hasseki Sultan Imaret in Jerusalem, established by Hasseki Hurrem Sultan (Roxelana), wife of Suleiman the Magnificent. In the 1596 tax registers it appeared as Isawiyya, in the Nahiya of Quds of the Liwa of Quds, with a population of 35 households and 3 bachelors, all Muslim. The villages paid a fixed tax-rate of 33.3% on wheat, barley, olive trees, vineyards, fruit trees, goats and beehives; a total of 6,940 akçe.

In 1838 it was noted as "a little village", located in the el Wadiyeh region, east of Jerusalem. An  Ottoman village list from about 1870  found that Isawiya had a population of 178, (or 78), in 29 houses, though the population count included only men. 

In 1883, the Palestine Exploration Fund's Survey of Western Palestine described El Aisawiyeh as a "small village on the eastern slope of the chain of Olivet, with a spring to the south and a few olives round it." Another source states the locals grew vegetables, which were sold in Jerusalem.

In 1896 the population was estimated to be about 210 persons.

British Mandate era

In the 1922 census of Palestine, conducted by the British Mandate authorities, 'Isawiyeh had a population of 333, all Muslims, increasing in the 1931 census to a population of 558; 7 Christians and the rest Muslim, occupying 117 houses.

In the 1945 statistics the population of Isawiya was 730; 720 Muslims and 10 Christians, who owned 10,108 dunams of land while 235 dunams had Jewish owners, according to an official land and population survey. 3,291 dunams were used for cereals, while 47 dunams were built-up (urban) land.

1948-1967
The Mount Scopus Agreement signed on July 7, 1948, regulated the demilitarised zone and authorized the United Nations Truce Supervision Organization to settle disputes between Israel and Jordan. One area of conflict involved two Jewish-owned plots in Issawiya, known as Gan Shlomit or Salomons Garden, which were purchased by V.F. Salomons in 1934 and sold to the Gan Shlomit Company, Ltd. in 1937.

In 1961, the population was 1,163, according to a Jordanian census.

In 1964, Issawiya had a population of 1,300. It was located at this time within the Mount Scopus demilitarized zone, an unsupervised demilitarized zone between Jordan and Israel.

Post-1967

Isawiya has been occupied by Israel since the Six-Day War in 1967. In that year Israel expropriated  approximately one quarter of Isawiya's lands (2,230 dunams). In January 1968 it appropriated a further 600 dunams. In 1975, 2,900 dunams of Isawiya land not annexed to Jerusalem were also expropriated as part of the development of Ma'ale Adunim. Some 100  dunams were then confiscated in 1982 to built route 1. From the mid eighties to the early 2000s Israel also reclassified another 3,800 dunams of Isawiya land not under cultivation as  Israeli state land,  and, in 2002 seized another 45 dunams to establish the Metzudat Adumim Border Police base, a measure which blocked Isawiya residents from accessing the little arable land left to them. By 2020, a development plan for an interchange near the eastern entrance to the village foresaw a prohibition on Isawiya residents from using a further 90 dunams. The Israel Nature and Parks Authority, together with the Jerusalem Municipal Council plans also to expropriate approximately a further 900 dunams, 450 for the Mount Scopus Slopes National Park and 450 for a construction-waste and dirt landfill.

B'tselem has claimed that since the beginning of the occupation Israel has taken 90% of Isawiya's land, using a variety of devices from  outright expropriation, declaring areas “state land”  to military seizure.  According to ARIJ, Issawiya had 1,212 dunums of land confiscated by Israel in order to construct various Israeli settlements and expand the Hebrew University:
568 dunums for the Hebrew University in 1968,
394 dunums for Giv’at Shappira (French Hill) in 1968,
248 dunums for Mishr Adummim in 1974,
2 dunums for Ma’ale Adummim in 1975.

Issawiya is located at the foot of French Hill, northwest of the road to Ma'ale Adumim. Under the jurisdiction of the Jerusalem Municipality, its citizens are considered permanent residents of the city, entitled to live and work in Israel without special permits. As permanent residents, they are also entitled to social benefits provided by Bituah Leumi (Israeli National Insurance Institute) and Israeli health insurance.

It is one of the poorest Jerusalem neighbourhoods. According to B'tselem, citing community leaders, the population is some 22,000 people while planners commissioned by the municipality and the local leadership say there are 3,700 to 4,000 apartments. The average population density is 25 people per dunam, almost three times the 8.9 in French Hill and 3.5 times the average population density in Jerusalem. Again, according to the same NGO, since April 2019, Isawiya has been subject to an ongoing campaign of harassment and collective punishment. By 2020, Israeli authorities had issued 136 pending demolition orders for homes in the neighborhood.

Land registry
Under Jordanian rule, land in Issawiya was registered under the owner's name, but registration stopped in 1967. Residents who apply for building permits are frequently turned down because ownership cannot be proven. Another problem is that land may belong to as many as ten clans. The land would need to be unified and then divided between all residents who claim ownership..Israeli municipal data  in 2015 calculated that Isawiya had 1,840 apartments, while a joint planning commission set the current figure (2020) at 3,700-4,000.

Education
According to the local mukhtar, 800 students in al-Issawiya lack classrooms. This has caused strikes among the students and protests among community leaders and parents. According to the Association for Civil Rights in Israel, the difference in schooling-standard between East and West Jerusalem is "staggering".
A girls' school in al-Issawiya is one of five elementary schools in the Jerusalem area that teach philosophy to third-graders as part of a program operating in 70 countries. A project sponsored by the Hebrew University of Jerusalem coordinates educational work with youth in Issawiya. Palestinian-Israeli students at the university undergo a training seminar that provides them with the requisite teaching and facilitation skills.

Economy
Some residents of the neighborhood work at Hadassah Medical Center, located on a hill overlooking the neighborhood.

Sports
In 2005, the Peres Center for Peace inaugurated a synthetic turf soccer field in Issawiya as part of the Twinned Peace Soccer School project. The soccer field was a priority in 1993 during Teddy Kollek's election year and had been allocated funding at the time, but was finally built with South Korean funding.

2019 and 2020 clashes

As of May 2020, for over a year, Special Patrol Unit and Border Police forces regularly enter the neighborhood; "It is evident that the police are not responding to disturbances in the neighborhood, on the contrary. The incursions spark the disturbance and there is compelling evidence that this is precisely the purpose of the nightly raids…" according to FMEP. Given the purpose, intensity and modality of these operations, they may amount to collective punishment according to human rights organizations.

See also
Samer Tariq Issawi

References

Bibliography

External links
Survey of Western Palestine, Map 17:  IAA, Wikimedia commons 
'Isawiya Town (Fact Sheet), Applied Research Institute–Jerusalem (ARIJ)
'Isawiya Town Profile, ARIJ
'Isawiya aerial photo, ARIJ
 Locality Development Priorities and Needs in 'Isawiya, ARIJ
The new Jerusalem Master Plan grabs 250 dunums of 'Issawiya village lands 01, December, 2004, ARIJ
Israel expands an Army Military Base East of Al 'Isawiya village 05, July, 2007, POICA
 Transferring 660 Dunums into a "Jewish National Park" in Al 'Isawiya town 04, March, 2010, POICA
More "Biblical Parks"… the confiscation of Al 'Isawiya and At Tur lands 07, December, 2011, POICA

Arab neighborhoods in Jerusalem